Sir Alasdair Duncan Atholl MacGregor KC (4 June 1883 – 30 October 1945) was a British lawyer and judge. He served as Attorney General in a number of British colonies in the early 20th century.  He was Chief Justice of Hong Kong from 1933 to 1945.

MacGregor's given names

MacGregor generally used the Christian name Atholl.  In some sources it is spelt Athol.  However, official announcements, such as his appointments and honours published in the London Gazette, refer to him, as would be expected, by his full name of Alasdair Duncan Atholl MacGregor.

Early life

MacGregor was born in 1883, the son of Henrietta Forrester and her husband, Robert Roy MacGregor. His father worked for the Exchequer. The family lived at 55 Grange Loan in south Edinburgh.

Atholl attended the University of Edinburgh, where he graduated with an MA, followed by Lincoln College, Oxford, where he obtained a BA. He was called to the bar of Lincoln's Inn in 1909.

Appointments

MacGregor served as assistant district commissioner of Southern Nigeria from 1912 to 1914. In 1914 he was appointed a police magistrate at Lagos and served in that position for 8 years. In 1922, he was appointed as Crown counsel and solicitor-general of Nigeria and served in that position until 1926. He was transferred to Trinidad in 1926 and then to Kenya in 1929. In both places, he served as the attorney-general. He was made a King's Counsel in 1927 while serving in Trinidad.

In 1933 MacGregor was appointed Chief Justice of Hong Kong in succession to Joseph Horsford Kemp. As Chief Justice he was reported to "have won golden opinions on the bench where he has displayed abilities of a high order, whilst socially also he has shown himself to be a man of marked charm of personality." In his capacity as Chief Justice of Hong Kong, he also sat as a member of the full court of the British Supreme Court for China in Shanghai.

MacGregor was knighted in 1935. In 1937, he was appointed chairman of a committee to study restoration of allowances to Malayan civil servants. He was made a Commander of the Grand Priory in the British Realm of the Venerable Order of the Hospital of St John of Jerusalem in 1940.

Internment by Japanese during World War II

MacGregor was interned by the Japanese in Stanley Internment Camp from 1941 to 1945. During the time he continued to act as Chief Justice for the internees, including granting a number of divorces.

MacGregor survived the war, but contracted beriberi in the camp. His last official act as Chief Justice was to swear in Franklin Charles Gimson as acting Governor of Hong Kong following the Japanese surrender.

Death

MacGregor was carried on to the first hospital ship leaving Hong Kong for England. He died on 30 October 1945 before reaching the Suez and was buried at sea.

He is memorialised on his parents' grave in Morningside Cemetery, Edinburgh.

References

1883 births
1945 deaths
Alumni of Lincoln College, Oxford
Alumni of the University of Edinburgh
Scottish expatriates in Hong Kong
British Hong Kong judges
British Supreme Court for China judges
British King's Counsel
Chief Justices of the Supreme Court of Hong Kong
Knights Bachelor
Members of Lincoln's Inn
20th-century King's Counsel
Internees at Stanley Internment Camp
Colonial Nigeria judges
Attorneys General of British Trinidad and Tobago
Attorneys General of British Kenya
Burials at sea